is an anime series adapted from the manga written and illustrated by Tomoko Ninomiya, which has been serialized by Kodansha in the biweekly josei (aimed at younger adult women) manga magazine Kiss since January 2001, with publication ongoing, and collected in 21 bound volumes as of August 2008. It received the 2004 Kodansha Manga Award for shōjo manga, and is licensed in North America by Del Rey Manga, in France by Pika Édition, in Thailand by NED Comics, in Indonesia by Elex Media Komputindo, and in Taiwan by Tong Li Comics.

The series was animated by J.C.Staff and produced by Fuji TV, comprising three seasons to date, with an original video animation (OVA) released 10 August 2009. The first season, called just Nodame Cantabile, was directed by Kenichi Kasai and the second season, called Nodame Cantabile: Paris Chapter, by Chiaki Kon. Both seasons starred Ayako Kawasumi as Megumi "Nodame" Noda and Tomokazu Seki as Shinichi Chiaki. Several works of classical music were featured in each episode under the musical direction of Suguru Matsutani. The orchestral music was performed by Nodame Orchestra, which consisted of members specially selected for the live-action drama of Nodame Cantabile, with professional support from the Tokyo Metropolitan Symphony Orchestra. The opening theme of season one was "Allegro Cantabile" by Suemitsu & The Suemith, and the ending themes were "Konna ni Chikaku de..." by Crystal Kay (episodes 1–12), "Sagittarius" by Suemitsu & the Nodame Orchestra (episodes 13–22), and "Allegro Cantabile" by Suemitsu & The Suemith (episode 23). The opening theme for season three was "Manazashi ☆ Daydream" by Yuu Sakai (with a variation on Jesu, Joy of Man’s Desiring from the cantata Herz und Mund und Tat und Leben, BWV 147 by J.S. Bach), and the ending theme was "Kaze to Oka no Ballad" by Real Paradis with Nodame Orchestra.

The series aired on Fuji TV and associated stations in the Noitamina time slot. The first season was broadcast in 23 episodes from 11 January to 28 June 2007, and the second season was broadcast in 11 episodes from 8 October 2008 to 18 December 2008. The opening episode of season one broke the record for audience share for its time-slot.

The first season was released on 8 DVDs between April and November 2007. The first DVD volume debuted at number 3 on the Oricon chart for anime the week it went on sale. A box set was released in February 2008 with an additional 15-minute original video animation (OVA), taking place between episodes 8 and 9. An English Dub of this Series is being aired all over Asia on Animax Asia since July 7, 2010.

Episode list

Nodame Cantabile

Nodame Cantabile: Paris

Nodame Cantabile: Finale

References

External links
 Official website
 
 

Nodame Cantabile
Nodame Cantabile